Almafuerte is a 1949 Argentine drama film directed by Luis César Amadori and written by Belisario García Villar. The film is a biography of the Argentine poet Pedro Bonifacio Palacios ("Almafuerte"). The film starred Narciso Ibáñez Menta as Almafuerte and Pola Alonso.

Awards
Almafuerte won the Silver Condor Award for Best Film, given by the Argentine Film Critics Association in 1950 for the best picture of the previous year. The film was also entered into the 1949 Cannes Film Festival.
The Argentine Academy of Cinematography Arts and Sciences gave several awards for this film.
Best Picture: Argentina Sono Film
Best original story: Pedro Miguel Obligado and Belisario García Villar
Best Actor: Narciso Ibáñez Menta
Best supporting actress: Eva Caselli
Best child interpretation: Panchito Lombard
Special mentions: Alberto Etchebehere (director of photography), Alejandro Gutiérrez del Barrrio (music), Mario Fezia (camera), José María Paleo (sound), Jorge Garate (montage) Alberto Curchi (camera).

Other cast
Eva Caselli
Federico Mansilla
Juan Bono
Pedro Pompillo
Fernando Labat
Adolfo Linvel
Ricardo Viana

References

External links

1949 films
Argentine historical drama films
Argentine biographical drama films
1940s Spanish-language films
Films directed by Luis César Amadori
1940s historical drama films
Argentine black-and-white films
1940s biographical drama films
1949 drama films
1940s Argentine films